The 2016–17 Colorado Buffaloes women's basketball team will represent University of Colorado Boulder during the 2016–17 NCAA Division I women's basketball season. The Buffaloes, led by first year head coach JR Payne, played their home games at the Coors Events Center and are a member of the Pac-12 Conference. They finished the season 17–16, 5–13 in Pac-12 play to finish in a 4 way tie for ninth place. They lost in the first round of the Pac-12 women's tournament to Washington State. They were invited to the Women's National Invitation Tournament where they defeated UNLV and South Dakota State in the first and second rounds before losing to Iowa in the third round.

Roster

Schedule

|-
!colspan=9 style="background:#000000; color:#CEBE70;"| Non-conference regular season

|-
!colspan=9 style="background:#000000; color:#CEBE70;"| Pac-12 regular season

|-
!colspan=9 style="background:#000000;"|  Pac-12 Women's Tournament

|-
!colspan=9 style="background:#000000;"|  WNIT

Rankings
2016–17 NCAA Division I women's basketball rankings

References

Colorado Buffaloes women's basketball seasons
Colorado
Colorado Buffaloes
Colorado Buffaloes
2017 Women's National Invitation Tournament participants